HKUST Institute for Emerging Market Studies (HKUST IEMS) is a university-level institute under the Office of the Vice-President for Research and Graduate Studies of The Hong Kong University of Science and Technology (HKUST).  It is launched on May 27, 2013, with 5 years of financial support from Ernst & Young. Over 30 faculty associates have joined the conversation about the challenges and opportunities facing businesses and policy-makers in emerging markets via HKUST IEMS. They mainly come from Division of Social Science in the School of Humanities and Social Science, and Departments of Economics, Finance, Management, Marketing, Accounting and ISOM of the School of Business and Management.

References

External links
 HKUST Institute for Emerging Market Studies official page
 The Hong Kong University of Science and Technology official page
 EY official page

Hong Kong University of Science and Technology
2013 establishments in Hong Kong